Pellotine is an alkaloid found in Lophophora species.  Pellotine is slightly narcotic, and has been used by Native Americans as a constituent of peyote for sacramental purposes.

Psychological and physiological effects 
8-10 mg of isolated pellotine is known to cause convulsions in frogs. When injected subcutaneously to humans, participants have reported drowsiness and a desire not to exert any physical or mental effort with one study reporting it to have hypnotic effects. It is also reported to lower blood pressure and heart rate.

Ancient use 
Native inhabitants of north-eastern Mexico around 810–1070 CE (according to carbon dating) are thought to have used a number of "mescal beans" containing pellotine, among other alkaloids and mescaline. While it is known that these pellotine-containing beans were ornamental, it is unclear whether they were used for their psychoactive effects.

See also
 Anhalamine
 Anhalidine
 Anhalinine
 Anhalonidine
 Gigantine

References

Lophophora
Isoquinoline alkaloids
Norsalsolinol ethers
Methoxy compounds
Phenols